DeWitt Echoles "Tex" Coulter  (October 26, 1924 – October 2, 2007) was an American gridiron football player. He played professionally in the National Football League (NFL) for the New York Giants and in the Interprovincial Rugby Football Union for the Montreal Alouettes. Coulter attended the United States Military Academy, where starred in football competed in the shot put.

References

External links

 
 

1924 births
2007 deaths
American football centers
American football ends
American football tackles
American male shot putters
American players of Canadian football
Army Black Knights football players
Army Black Knights men's track and field athletes
New York Giants players
Montreal Alouettes players
All-American college football players
Eastern Conference Pro Bowl players
Players of American football from Fort Worth, Texas
Track and field athletes from Texas
Military personnel from Texas